Amanda Davied (born March 18, 1981) is the head women's basketball coach and former player at Pittsburg State University. Prior to becoming head coach in May 2018, Davied was an assistant coach for the Pittsburg State women's basketball team since her graduation in December 2003.

Career

Early career 
Davied, a Farlington, Kansas, native, began her coaching career as a graduate assistant for her alma mater following her playing career in 2003. During her time as a player, Davied scored nearly 1300 points in four years, landing her in ninth place for scoring in Pittsburg State history. She holds several other records in the program.

Pittsburg State University 
In 2003, Davied served as a graduate assistant before being promoted to a full-time assistant at the end of the season. During her time as an assistant coach, Davied helped lead the Gorillas to one regular season conference championship, five trips to the NCAA Tournament, and was the primary recruiting coordinator for the program.

On May 21, 2018, Davied was named the sixth head coacher Pittsburg State, after Lane Lord left for Texas–Rio Grande Valley.

Head coach record

References

External links
 Pittsburg State profile

1981 births
Living people
American women's basketball coaches
Basketball coaches from Kansas
People from Crawford County, Kansas
Pittsburg State Gorillas women's basketball coaches
Pittsburg State Gorillas women's basketball players